They Came Back, known in the UK as The Returned, is a 2004 French horror drama film directed by Robin Campillo in his directorial debut. The film was screened at the Hamburg Fantasy Filmfest in Germany, the Venice Film Festival in Italy, and the Toronto International Film Festival in Canada.

Unlike the typical zombie film, in which the physically deformed undead compulsively feed on or otherwise harm the human population, the physically normal undead in They Came Back seek only to reintegrate themselves into the everyday life of the small French town where they formerly lived, or so it seems.

Plot

The recently deceased of an anonymous French town suddenly return to life, calmly streaming forth from a cemetery in a silent procession. The town council, led by the mayor (Victor Garrivier), makes plans to house the returned and help reintroduce them to society. The mayor informs the council that the event has lasted for roughly two hours throughout France, returning an estimated 70 million people to life nationwide, with more than 13,000 in their town alone, all of whom had died within the previous 10 years.

However, the reintegration poses challenges. The returned suffer from effects similar to those that may be seen after severe concussion, such as disorientation, sleep disturbance, and wandering.  Former professionals among the returned are moved to menial jobs when it becomes clear that, although they can perform rote tasks, they can no longer engage in spontaneous problem solving or planning, and that even their apparent consciousness may be an illusion. This behaviour adds to the growing sentiment that the returned are different from their former selves. However, while the returned generally function sluggishly during the day, a doctor named Gardet (Frédéric Pierrot) has become suspicious of the returned after observing some of them clandestinely attending animated meetings, conducted in the middle of the night, during which their symptoms seem to disappear.

Nonetheless, the returned reunite with their former loved ones: the mayor's wife, Martha (Catherine Samie), with the mayor; a 6-year-old boy, Sylvain (Saady Delas), with his parents, Isham (Djemel Barek) and Véronique (Marie Matheron); a young man, Mathieu (Jonathan Zaccaï), with his wife, Rachel (Géraldine Pailhas). Rachel is initially reluctant to see Mathieu, until one day he follows her home, acting as though he never left. Rachel eventually accepts him, and the two make love. In addition to the nocturnal meetings of the returned, Gardet also observes the gradual reunion of Rachel and Mathieu with growing concern, but when he tries to warn her of possible danger, Rachel rebuffs him.

One evening a series of explosions tears through the town, apparently detonated by the returned in an act of mass sabotage but without inflicting any casualties. In the chaos, the returned head for a network of tunnels. The mayor attempts to stop his wife from leaving with the rest but begins to feel ill and, after Martha urges him to "give in", apparently dies, only to appear later in the tunnels among the returned. The military responds by gassing the returned with a chemical that induces a permanent coma.

After guiding some of the returned to the tunnels, Mathieu makes his way back to Rachel, and recounts to her the events leading to his fatal car accident. He reveals that he crashed the car while looking for her after the two had fought. Rachel follows him into the tunnels, tearfully kissing him before he disappears into the darkness. She returns to the surface and observes the military carting away the comatose bodies. The bodies are laid atop their graves in the cemetery and slowly vanish.

Cast 
 Géraldine Pailhas as Rachel
 Jonathan Zaccaï as Mathieu
 Frédéric Pierrot as Gardet
 Victor Garrivier as The mayor
 Catherine Samie as Martha
 Djemel Barek as Isham
 Marie Matheron as Véronique
 Saady Delas as Sylvain

Critical response

Review aggregation website Rotten Tomatoes reported an approval rating of 78%, based on 9 reviews, with an average rating of 6.2/10.

In one of the more negative reviews, The Village Voice remarked that "They Came Back suffers from long-winded earnestness and, despite some poetic conceits, its allegory ultimately doesn't parse."

Spin-offs
Les Revenants (TV series), a French television series adaptation of the film
The Returned (U.S. TV series), an American remake of the French TV series

References

External links
 
 

2004 horror films
2004 films
French zombie films
2000s horror thriller films
2000s thriller drama films
Films directed by Robin Campillo
Films scored by Jocelyn Pook
French horror drama films
French horror thriller films
2004 drama films
2000s French films